Fabrice Gatambiye Ngarura (born 19 January 2000) is a Finnish professional footballer who plays as a midfielder for Gnistan. He was born in the Democratic Republic of the Congo.

Club career
On 9 March 2022, Gatambiye signed with Gnistan for the 2022 season.

References

2000 births
Living people
Finnish footballers
Vaasan Palloseura players
IF Gnistan players
Veikkausliiga players
Kakkonen players
Association football midfielders
Finnish people of Democratic Republic of the Congo descent